Stephen Bogardus (born March 11, 1954) is an American actor.

Biography
Born in Norfolk, Virginia, Bogardus graduated from Choate Rosemary Hall in 1972 and Princeton University in 1976, where he was a member of the Princeton Nassoons and the Princeton Triangle Club.

Career
Bogardus studied acting at HB Studio. His first role was as one of the Sheriff's men in a local production of Robin Hood on MacArthur Drive in Greenwich, Connecticut.

He made his first New York City appearance in a stage adaptation of the film The Umbrellas of Cherbourg at Joseph Papp's Public Theater in 1979. His additional off-Broadway credits include March of the Falsettos (1981), In Trousers (1985), Falsettoland (1990), and Love! Valour! Compassion! (1994), which transferred to Broadway the following year, and Man of La Mancha (2002). He received both Obie and Tony Award nominations for his performance in Love! Valour! Compassion!, and reprised his role in the 1997 film.  He was featured in the City Center concert series Encores! in Sweet Adeline (1997) and Allegro as Joseph Taylor Jr. (1994).

His Broadway work includes West Side Story (1980), Les Misérables, November 1987 - June 1988 as Grantaire, in addition to other roles, Safe Sex (1987), The Grapes of Wrath, King David (Concert, 1997), High Society (1998), James Joyce's The Dead (April 4, 2000 to April 16, 2000 as Gabriel Conroy), Man of La Mancha (2002, Dr. Carrasco), and Old Acquaintance (2007).

In 2008, he starred as Bob Wallace in the Broadway and U.S. touring productions of White Christmas, a role he had performed in 2005 at the Wang Center in Boston and in 2006 in St. Paul.

In 2014-2016, Bogardus originated and appeared on Broadway in the role of Daddy Cane in Steve Martin and Edie Brickell's Bright Star.

In regional theatre, Bogardus appeared in M. Butterfly at the Arena Stage, Washington, D.C.; William Finn's, Elegies, Canon Theatre, Los Angeles; and James Joyce's The Dead at the Ahmanson Theater, Los Angeles and the Kennedy Center, Washington, D.C.

Bogardus' extensive television credits include small roles on the daytime soaps Another World, All My Children and Guiding Light; and numerous guest appearances on prime time series, including Cagney and Lacey, Law & Order, Law & Order: Special Victims Unit, Law & Order: Criminal Intent, Ed, Monk and Conviction.

In June 2020 he unsuccessfully ran for the presidency of the labor union Actors' Equity Association, challenging incumbent Kate Shindle.

Personal
Bogardus is married to dancer Dana Moore. In 1998, they appeared opposite each other in Chicago, with Bogardus as lawyer Billy Flynn and Moore as Velma Kelly. In 2002, they appeared together in Damn Yankees as Lola and Mr. Applegate at the Boston Center for The Arts, Boston, Massachusetts. They have an adopted son, Jackson Bogardus.

Broadway credits
 West Side Story (1980)
 Les Misérables (1987)
 The Grapes of Wrath (1990)
 Falsettos (1992)
 King David (1997)
 Love! Valour! Compassion! (1998), 
 High Society (1998)
 James Joyce's The Dead (2000)
 Man of La Mancha (2002 revival)
 Old Acquaintance (2007)
 White Christmas  (2008)
 Bright Star (2016)

Awards and nominations

References

External links
 
 
 
 Biography at filmreference.com

1954 births
Male actors from Virginia
American male musical theatre actors
American male stage actors
American male television actors
Living people
Choate Rosemary Hall alumni
Princeton University alumni
Actors from Norfolk, Virginia
20th-century American male actors
21st-century American male actors